Choctaw Lake may refer to:

 Choctaw Lake, Ohio
 Choctaw Lake (Mississippi)
 Choctaw Lake (Prairie County, Arkansas), see List of lakes in Prairie County, Arkansas
 Choctaw Lake (Van Buren County, Arkansas), see List of lakes in Van Buren County, Arkansas